The African Handball Junior Nations Championship is the official competition for junior men's national handball teams of Africa, and takes place every two years. In addition to crowning the African champions, the tournament also serves as a qualifying tournament for the World Junior Handball Championship.

Medal summary

Medal count

Participation details

See also
 African Men's Handball Championship
 African Men's Youth Handball Championship

External links
African Junior Men's Championship history - cahbonline
Equipes nationale de Handball

Juniors
Men's sports competitions in Africa
Youth sport in Africa